The địa danh (chữ Hán: 地名), also known as tên chữ (chữ Nôm: 𠸛𡨸) are Sino-Vietnamese names that are used for Vietnamese place names. The reasoning behind the names are for official and historical usage by the government which uses Hán văn (Literary Chinese) in official documents.

Origin

The name is sometimes called Địa danh chi Hán văn (地名之漢文).

It is used in contrast to the tên Nôm (𠸛喃), or vernacular name, written in locally derived characters unique to transcribe native Vietnamese words. In the Red River Delta, the demotic Vietnamese place name often begins with "Kẻ 仉" for example: Kẻ Mẩy 仉𨊋 (whereas the tên chữ, or Hán Việt name, is Mễ Trì 米池), Kẻ Cót 仉榾 (formally Yên Quyết 嫣決), Kẻ Vọng 仉望 (Dịch Vọng 懌望).

Many, if not most city names in Vietnam are Sino-Vietnamese, but some cities also have earlier Nôm names: 
 Hà Nội 河內 (Hanoi) is Sino-Vietnamese and has had many Sino-Vietnamese names - Thăng Long 昇龍, Đông Kinh 東京- but the oldest name was in chữ Nôm, Kẻ Chợ 仉𢄂, found on some early Portuguese-made maps as "Cachao".
 Lý Sơn 理山 is a Sino-Vietnamese name, but concurrently the demotic name Cù Lao Ré 𡵺嶗哩 is also used.
Major cities with Vietnamese demotic names include: 
 Huế 化 is a fully Vietnamese demotic name: when written in chữ Nho it is named Thuận Hóa 順化 or Phú Xuân 富春.
 Sài Gòn 柴棍 (Saigon) is also a demotic name: the formal tên chữ historical name in chữ Nho is Gia Định 嘉定.
 Likewise Cam Ranh, Vũng Tàu, Phan Rang, Mỹ Tho, Cần Thơ, Kẻ Sặt, Bãi Cháy, Móng Cái, Chợ Lớn, Bến Nghé.
In these cases later Sino-Vietnamese names were derived by local Vietnamese Confucian administrators with homonymic phonetic approximations (Cam Ranh; Cam Linh) or semantic translations (Bến Nghé; Ngưu chử). Some however are completely unrelated (Sông Cầu; Xuân Đài).

References

Vietnamese language
Vietnamese words and phrases